Saskatchewan Highway 240 is a  secondary provincial highway in the province of Saskatchewan in Canada. The road runs from Saskatchewan Highway 55 in the Rural Municipality of Shellbrook No. 493 to Highway 263 in Prince Albert National Park.

Route description 
The road starts at Highway 55 and starts heading north towards Prince Albert National Park. Once it enters, it turns to the east and intersects Saskatchewan Highway 693 from the south. It keeps going east in the park until it ends at Highway 263.

Major intersections

References

240